The year 2005 is the fourth year in the history of Cage Warriors, a mixed martial arts promotion based in the United Kingdom. In 2005, Cage Warriors Fighting Championship held 9 events beginning with, CWFC - Quest 1.

Events list

CWFC: Quest 1

CWFC: Quest 1 was an event held on April 8, 2005 in Sheffield, England.

Results

CWFC: Ultimate Force

CWFC: Ultimate Force was an event held on April 30, 2005 in Sheffield, England.

Results

CWFC: Strike Force

CWFC: Strike Force was an event held on May 21, 2005 in Coventry, England.

Results

CWFC: Strike Force 2

CWFC: Strike Force 2 was an event held on July 16, 2005 in Coventry, England.

Results

CWFC: Quest 2

CWFC: Quest 2 was an event held on July 29, 2005 in Sheffield, England.

Results

CWFC: Quest 3

CWFC: Quest 3 was an event held on September 17, 2005 in Sheffield, England.

Results

CWFC: Strike Force 3

CWFC: Strike Force 3 was an event held on October 1, 2005 in Coventry, England.

Results

CWFC: Strike Force 4

CWFC: Strike Force 4 was an event held on November 26, 2005 in Coventry, England.

Results

CWFC: Quest 4

CWFC: Quest 4 was an event held on December 11, 2005 in Sheffield, England.

Results

See also 
 Cage Warriors

References

Cage Warriors events
2005 in mixed martial arts